The Fulda monastery school, also known as the Rabanus Maurus School after its founder Abbot Rabanus Maurus, is a high school in the German city of Fulda. It developed from the monastery school founded in AD 748 and is therefore one of the oldest schools in Germany.

External links
Rabanus Maurus School website (in German)

Gymnasiums in Germany
8th-century establishments in Germany
Buildings and structures completed in 748
Catholic secondary schools in Germany
Schools in Hesse
Buildings and structures in Fulda